Quinto Maganini (30 November 1897 – 10 March 1974) was an American composer, flautist, and conductor.

Biography
Quinto Maganini was born in Fairfield, California, but he spent much of his life in New York City. He worked as a flautist in the San Francisco Symphony Orchestra, the New York Symphony Orchestra, and the Russian Symphony Orchestra.

While playing flute and piccolo in John Philip Sousa's band in San Francisco, he was discovered by American conductor Walter Damrosch, who invited him to join the New York Symphony Orchestra. As a member of the orchestra, he studied flute with Georges Barrère.

In 1927, he won a Pulitzer Prize for several of his compositions, including his symphonic poem Tuolumne, California Rhapsody; A Cuban Rhapsody and Songs of the Chinese. In 1928, he received a Guggenheim Fellowship to compose a symphony on the life of Napoleon I, a violin sonata and an opera based on Bret Harte's The Bellringer of Angels. These awards enabled him to travel to France, where he studied composition with Nadia Boulanger at the American Conservatory at Fontainebleau.

In 1931, he founded the New York Sinfonietta and served as its conductor. Some of their repertoire included Baroque works he had found through his research in France.

From 1940 to 1967, he served as principal conductor of the Norwalk Symphony Orchestra. In his tenure, he expanded the symphony's repertoire to include larger works, like the symphonies of Gustav Mahler.

Compositions

His principal compositions include Tuolumne, California Rhapsody for trumpet and orchestra (1926), A Cuban Rhapsody (1926), Songs of the Chinese for women's voices and instrumental ensemble (1926), and a flute sonata (1928).

References

1897 births
1974 deaths
20th-century composers
American male conductors (music)
People from California
American male classical composers
American classical composers
20th-century American composers
20th-century American conductors (music)
20th-century American male musicians